Club Deportivo Hijos Mutuos de Acosvinchos  is a Peruvian football club based in Lima, located in the district of Ate. It was founded in 1946.

History
In the 2006 Copa Perú, the club classified to National Stage but was eliminated by Total Clean in the final.

In the 2012 Peruvian Segunda División, the club was relegated to the Copa Perú.

Honours

National
Copa Perú: 0
Runner-up (1): 2006

Regional
Región IV: 0
Runner-up (1): 2006

Liga Departamental de Lima: 2
Winners (2): 2005, 2006

Liga Provincial de Lima: 1
Winners (1): 2005

Liga Distrital de Ate: 4
Winners (4): 2001, 2002, 2003, 2005

Liga Distrital de Breña: 0
Runner-up (1): 2014

See also
List of football clubs in Peru
Peruvian football league system

External links
 Official Website
 Fans' Website

Football clubs in Peru
Association football clubs established in 1946
1946 establishments in Peru